Anatole Zongo Kuyo (born 20 January 1963) is an Ivorian sprinter. He competed in the men's 4 × 400 metres relay at the 1988 Summer Olympics.

References

1963 births
Living people
Athletes (track and field) at the 1988 Summer Olympics
Ivorian male sprinters
Olympic athletes of Ivory Coast
Place of birth missing (living people)